The Pourakino River is a river in New Zealand, flowing into the Jacobs River Estuary at Riverton.

See also
List of rivers of New Zealand

References

Rivers of Southland, New Zealand
Foveaux Strait
Rivers of New Zealand